Eliud Kibet Kirui (born 15 August 1975) is a Kenyan long-distance runner.

At the 2004 World Cross Country Championships, he finished sixth in the short race, while the Kenyan team, of which Kirui was a part, won the bronze medal in the team competition.

Personal bests
3000 metres - 7:53.41 min (2002)
3000 metres steeplechase - 8:17.62 min (2004)

External links

1975 births
Living people
Kenyan male middle-distance runners
Kenyan male long-distance runners
Kenyan male steeplechase runners
Kenyan male cross country runners
20th-century Kenyan people
21st-century Kenyan people